Smooth Sailin is the 24th album released by The Isley Brothers on Warner Bros. Records on March 14, 1987. This album was the first that the brothers released as a duo of Rudolph and Ronald after the untimely death of eldest brother O'Kelly, who had died in March of the previous year of a heart attack.

Reception

Hooking up with R&B singer-songwriter Angela Winbush for this album, the Isleys scored with the top 10 R&B title track and "I Wish", also an R&B top 40 hit.

Track listing

Personnel
The Isley Brothers
Ronald Isley – lead & background vocals
Rudolph Isley – lead & background vocals

with
Tony Maiden – guitar (tracks 1-6)
Angela Winbush – keyboards (tracks 2-8), Moog synthesizer (track 7); bass synthesizer (tracks 1, 2), drum machine (track 5), additional background vocals (tracks 2, 3, 7)
Jeff Lorber – additional synthesizers (tracks 1, 3-6)
Raymond Reeder – synthesizer (tracks 7); string line guitar synthesizer & drum machine (track 8)
Nathan East – bass (tracks 1, 3-6)
Louis Johnson – bass (track 2)
Gregory Phillinganes – bass synthesizer (track 2)
Rayford Griffin – drums (tracks 1, 2, 6)
Andre Fischer – drums (tracks 4, 7)
Paulinho da Costa – percussion (tracks 1-3, 5)

Technical personnel & arrangements
Produced by Ronald Isley, Rudolph Isley & Angela Winbush
Recorded & mixed by Steve Sykes
Additional engineer (Conway Studios): Czaba Petocz
Assistant engineer (Ocean Way Recording): Bob Loftus, Joe Schiff, Mike Ross
Assistant engineer (Westlake Studios): Debbie Johnson
Mastered by Brian Gardner
Art direction & design by Janet Levinson
Photography by Jeff Katz

Charts

Weekly charts

Year-end charts

References

External links
 The Isley Brothers - Smooth Sailin' (1987) album releases & credits at Discogs
 The Isley Brothers - ''Smooth Sailin''' (1987)  album to be listened as stream on Spotify

1987 albums
The Isley Brothers albums
Albums produced by Ronald Isley
Albums produced by Angela Winbush
Warner Records albums